Leer County is an administrative division of Western Upper Nile in South Sudan. The headquarters are in the town of Leer.

In December 2009 that traffic police had established road blocks along the road between Panyijar County and Leer and were demanded high bribes from travelers who wanted to pass.
In March 2011 the Governor of Unity State, Taban Deng Gai, launched a drive to recruit men for the army. In April, Leer County police were reportedly enrolling young men into the Sudan People's Liberation Army by force, apparently on orders from the County Commissioner, who was in turn obeying the Governor's orders.
On 12 May 2011 landmines in the road from Leer to Bentiu exploded, destroying two vehicles, killing three people and seriously injured others. The border with Sudan to the north was blocked, causing shortages of supplies, and there were rumors that militias were moving south through the county.

References

Unity (state)
Counties of South Sudan